Running Still is the third album by British singer-songwriter Charlie Winston.  It was released by Real World Records on 21 November 2011. "Hello Alone" was released as the lead single on 3 October 2011.

The album was certified gold and then platinum by the UPFI in 2012.

Reception

Running Still received mixed reviews from critics upon release. On Metacritic, the album holds a score of 60/100 based on 4 reviews, indicating "mixed or average reviews".

Track listing
 "Hello Alone" (3:18)
 "Speak to Me" (3:20)
 "Where Can I Buy Happiness?" (3:43)
 "The Great Conversation" (4:18)
 "She Went Quietly" (4:01)
 "Unlike Me" (3:49)
 "Until You're Satisfied" (3:24)
 "Wild Ones" (3:52)
 "Making Yourself so Lonely" (4:16)
 "Rockin' in the Suburbs" (3:06)
 "Summertime Here All Year" (5:03)
 "Lift Me Gently" (3:43)

Charts

Weekly charts

Year-end charts

References

External links
 The official Charlie Winston website

2011 albums
Charlie Winston albums